Rénelle Lamote (born 26 December 1993) is a French middle-distance runner who specialises in the 800 metres. She is a triple European Athletics Championships silver medallist in the event from 2016, 2018 and 2022. Lamote won also a silver at the 2019 European Indoor Championships.

She was the 800 m 2015 European Under-23 champion.

Career
Rénelle Lamote was born to an Ivorian mother and a French father.

She represented her country at the 2014 European Championships and 2015 European Indoor Championships, reaching the semifinals on both occasions.

Her personal bests in the 800 metres are: 1:57.84 outdoors (Lausanne 2022) and 2:01.97 indoors (Glasgow 2015).

Competition record

References

1993 births
Living people
People from Coulommiers
French female middle-distance runners
World Athletics Championships athletes for France
European Athletics Championships medalists
Athletes (track and field) at the 2016 Summer Olympics
Olympic athletes of France
Sportspeople from Seine-et-Marne
Athletes (track and field) at the 2020 Summer Olympics
21st-century French women